The videography of English singer-songwriter and actor David Bowie (1947–2016). This page gives an overview of his music video singles, music video films and compilations, live music films and music documentaries.

Music videos 
This subsection and 'Posthumous music video singles' lists music videos that were prepared to accompany single releases. See the subsection titled 'Music video films' for projects where music videos were originally conceived as films (a single video in a wider filmic setting or collection of music videos produced as a single project, or an amalgam of both); and the subsection titles 'Music video compilations' for audio-visual releases that were compiled from video music singles for later release.

Music videos as a member of Tin Machine

Music video films 
This subsection of music videos lists audio-visual releases that were originally conceived as films, that is, a single video in a wider filmic setting or collection of music videos produced as a single project, or an amalgam of both.

Music video films as a member of Tin Machine

Live television films 
Live television films are concerts staged specifically for television broadcast.

Live concert films 
Live concert films are tour concerts filmed for TV broadcast, cinema release and / or the home video market.

Live concert films as a member of Tin Machine

Music videos and films compilations 
This subsection of music videos lists audio-visual releases that were compiled from video music singles and Live TV and concert performances and films.

Music documentary films

Other video and television appearances

See also 

 David Bowie filmography - a list of Bowie's appearances in film.

Notes

References

Sources

Videographies of British artists
Videography